The Noesis Cultural Society (Romanian Societatea Culturală Noesis) is a Romanian organization that produces and markets CD-ROM-based works pertaining to Romanian culture and thought. They are based in Bucharest, Romania. "Noesis" is an Ancient Greek word for "thought".

Founded in autumn 1998 by Remus Cernea, among their projects to date  are "virtual encyclopedias" on Constantin Brâncuși, Nichita Stănescu, and I.L. Caragiale. They have also produced several "virtual anthologies" of contemporary Romanian artists, writers, and academics. Each of these anthologies has contained the equivalent of fifty ordinary books on a CD-ROM and has sold for a price comparable to a single book. This strategy is particularly interesting for a country where money is generally in short supply, but where most academics and intellectuals have access to computers.

On-line books 
 Istoria cinematografiei universale. Eseuri, vol. 1, Noesis, noiembrie 2001  (by Mircea Dumitrescu)

References

External links
 Their official web site. This is Flash-based, and  appears to be still partially under construction.

Culture in Bucharest